Nathan Jung (November 29, 1946 – April 24, 2021) was an American actor and stuntman. Due to his height, he was usually cast in "heavy" or "enforcer" roles.

Career

Television
Jung played the character of Genghis Khan on Star Trek: The Original Series in the episode, "The Savage Curtain" (1969), an axe-wielding villain named "The Dark Rider" who fought David Carradine in the TV series Kung Fu on the episode "Arrogant Dragon" (1974), and appeared opposite Bruce Lee as a Tong Enforcer in Lee's only pure acting (and non-martial arts) role on the TV show Here Come the Brides, in the episode "Marriage, Chinese Style" (1969). Jung also played Saburyo, Helen Funai's cousin on an episode of Sanford and Son entitled "Home Sweet Home" (1974).

Jung has been on a number of other TV shows including General Hospital (as Won Chu), Starsky and Hutch (as "Itchy" in the episode "Nightlight" (1976)), M*A*S*H (as the Korean Man), The Misadventures of Sheriff Lobo (as Kahuna), Manimal (as Tang), Magnum P.I. (as Yaikra), The A-Team (as Chi), Falcon Crest (as Chao-Li's cousin), The Hardy Boys/Nancy Drew Mysteries (as Cho-Lin), Hunter (as the henchman "Mongol" that goes toe-to-toe against Fred Dryer), Riptide (as Kona, Al Leong's colleague), Joe Forrester,  and The New Mike Hammer.

Jung has also appeared in the TV shows Lois & Clark: The New Adventures of Superman (in two episodes - "Chi of Steel" (1995) and "Illusions of Grandeur" (1994) - as "Jzuk-Mao"), Martial Law (as the villain Wen in the Martial Law pilot episode, "Shanghai Express" (1998)), as well as Highway to Heaven (as Yoji), Burke's Law, Dear John and Tour of Duty.

Film
Jung has acted in the films Surf Ninjas (as Leslie Nielsen's henchman, Manchu), as the henchman Bulkus in John Landis's first film, Kentucky Fried Movie (as Bulkus in the Enter the Dragon spoof segment entitled A Fistful of Yen), as The Wing Kong Hatchet Man in Big Trouble in Little China, as the Bonsai Club Manager in Showdown in Little Tokyo (speaking a line of dialogue in Japanese to stars Dolph Lundgren and Brandon Lee, making him one of the few actors to appear in movies or TV shows alongside both Bruce Lee and his son Brandon Lee), and also appeared in films such as Sam Raimi's Darkman (as the Chinese Warrior), The Shadow (as the Tibetan Kidnapper), American Yakuza (as The Big Yakuza), Beverly Hills Ninja (as the Fisherman), Corvette Summer (as the bouncer that roughs up Mark Hamill's character), Longshot (as Odd Job) and more.

Jung has also acted in Asian American independent films such as Justin Lin's Finishing The Game (as Bob, the Nazi villain that faces off against Roger Fan's Breeze Loo) in the "Fists of Fuhrer" segment that was directed by Evan Jackson Leong (Director of the film Linsanity: The Movie) and Juwan Chung's Baby (as the Restaurant Guy in a scene opposite David Huynh, who played the title character).

Jung also appears as himself, the narrator, in Timothy Tau's short documentary, Nathan Jung v. Bruce Lee, where he recounts the first time he met Bruce Lee (played by Jason Yee) on the set of the TV show Here Come the Brides in 1969 and with Allen Rowe portraying a younger version of him in narrative flashbacks; the film also won a Best Original Script and Best Comedy award at the 2018 Asians on Film Festival and has screened at the 2019 Seattle Asian American Film Festival, the 2018 Taiwanese American Film Festival and the 2018 Vancouver Asian Film Festival.

Upon Jung's death on April 24, 2021, Nathan Jung v. Bruce Lee was shared and his death was covered by outlets including Variety, Deadline Hollywood, SyFy Wire, The Independent (UK), The Daily Express (UK), News.com.au, The New Zealand Herald, NY Daily News, Heavy.com, Yahoo! Lifestyle, Daily Star Trek News, Comicbook.com, Outsider, AsAm News, iHorror, Giant Freakin Robot and more.

Personal life
Jung died in Los Angeles on April 24, 2021, at the age of 74.

Selected filmography

Film

Assorted TV Roles

References

External links

Nathan Jung Filmography on Fandango

1946 births
2021 deaths
American male actors of Chinese descent
Male actors from Bakersfield, California